Biclonuncaria dalbergiae is a species of moth of the family Tortricidae. It is found in Brazil in the states of Rio de Janeiro, Minas Gerais, Paraná and Santa Catarina.

References

Moths described in 1993
Polyorthini